KZMI (103.9 FM) is a radio station broadcasting an Adult Contemporary music format. Licensed to Garapan-Saipan, Northern Mariana Islands, the station is currently owned by Cecilia Lifoifoi, through licensee Holonet Corporation.

The station was assigned the KZMI call letters by the Federal Communications Commission on September 1, 1984.

References

External links
 
 

ZMI
Mainstream adult contemporary radio stations in the United States
Radio stations established in 1984
1984 establishments in the Northern Mariana Islands
Garapan
Saipan
Adult contemporary radio stations in insular areas of the United States